Pisaster giganteus, the giant sea star or giant spined star, is a species of sea star that lives along the western coast of North America from Southern California to British Columbia. It makes its home on rocky shores near the low tide mark. It preys on mollusks. Its color varies from brown to red or purple.

Reproduction and regeneration
Giant sea stars have small eggs, and their sperm contain spherical heads.  Once their larvae are born, they are bilaterally symmetrical. By the time they mature and reach adulthood they are centered on a set point with radial symmetry to their bodies.  The gonads of the giant sea star grow in a winters time just in time for spawning season between the months of March and April.

Habitat
Giant sea stars are usually found around the protected coastlines with low tide.  They can often be found attached to rocks, pier supports or in the sand.

Description
Giant sea stars have a dense body with wide arms. Its surface is either tan or brown, but on occasion the giant sea star can have a yellowish or grayish surface. They contain thick, blunt spines that are bluish in color with white, pink or purple tips that are swollen and surrounded by brown fuzz and pedicellariae that have a plier like shape. These pedicellariae are used as a protective mechanism against predators. They have no distinct pattern. They are usually found up to  down in the water.

Predators and prey
The giant sea star only has a few predators. Sea otters and sea birds feed on giant sea stars, and their larvae are eaten by certain types of sea snails. They prey on several kinds of sea organisms including barnacles, gastropods, bivalves, and limpets.  It eats its prey by extending its stomach so it can fit into tiny gaps, such as mussel shells.

Sources
Aquarius Aquarium Institute: Giant Sea Star
Landenberger, Donald E. "Studies on Selective Feeding in the Pacific Starfish Pisaster in Southern California." Ecology, Vol. 49, No. 6 (Nov., 1968), pp. 1062-1075. Online. March 3, 2008.
Taxonomicon

References 

Asteriidae
Starfish described in 1857
Taxa named by William Stimpson